Sabine Channel Provincial Park, also known as Sabine Channel Marine Provincial Park, is a provincial park in British Columbia, Canada, in the waters surrounding Jervis Island in Sabine Channel, which separates Texada Island (N) from Lasqueti Island (S).  Established in 2001, the parks is approximately 2,254 ha. in size.

See also
List of British Columbia provincial parks

References

BC Parks infopage

Provincial Parks of the Gulf Islands
Provincial parks of British Columbia
Protected areas established in 2001
2001 establishments in British Columbia
Marine parks of Canada